Blue Brave: The Legend of Formosa 1895, known simply as 1895; Pha̍k-fa-sṳ: Yit-pat-kíu-ńg Yet-vùi, is a Taiwanese Hakka film based on the Japanese Invasion of Taiwan in 1895, with emphasis on the Hakka fighters and their families in the conflict. The film has a limited budget of NT$60 million with roughly half of it provided by the Council for Hakka Affairs of the Executive Yuan. The film was released on November 7, 2008, and was the highest-grossing Taiwanese film in that year.

Plot

Reception 
The film won the Best Drama Series award in the Asian Television Awards in 2009. A review published in the Taipei Times stated that the film "educational at best" and geared toward students and teachers of history.

References

External links

2008 films
2000s war films
Films set in 1895
Taiwanese war drama films
Hakka culture in Taiwan
Hakka Chinese-language films
Taiwanese-language films
2000s Mandarin-language films
2000s Japanese-language films